The Hudson College of Public Health is one of the seven colleges of the University of Oklahoma Health Sciences Center--the health sciences branch of the University of Oklahoma.

Established in 1967, it is the only college of public health accredited by the Council on Education for Public Health in the state of Oklahoma. The Hudson College of Public Health was ranked number 6 in the Top 10 Colleges of Public Health nationwide by College Magazine. The College bears the name of alumni Dr. Leslie and J. Clifford Hudson for their generous donation.

Academics

Degrees Awarded
The Hudson College of Public Health grants the professional degree of Master of Public Health (MPH) and the Master of Health Administration (MHA) and the graduate degree of Master of Science (MS) and Doctor of Philosophy (PhD). 

Professional and degree programs offered by the four departments of the College:
 Biostatistics and Epidemiology: MPH, MS, PhD.
 Health Administration and Policy: MHA.
 Health Promotion Sciences: MPH, MS, PhD.
 Occupational and Environmental Health: MPH, MS, PhD.

Research Centers
 The Center for American Indian Health Research coordinates the Strong Heart Study--the largest epidemiological study of cardiovascular disease and its risk factors among American Indians.

See also 
 Public Health
 University of Oklahoma Health Sciences Center
 University of Oklahoma

References

External links 
 Official Website

Schools of public health in the United States
Educational institutions established in 1967
Medical and health organizations based in Oklahoma
Academic health science centres
Universities and colleges in Oklahoma City